Pratheeksha G Pradeep is an Indian television actress who appears in Malayalam-language soap operas.

Filmography

Films

Television

Special appearances

References

External links
 

Living people
21st-century Indian actresses
Actresses in Malayalam television
Indian television actresses
Year of birth missing (living people)